The Sinchon Museum of American War Atrocities (Korean: 신천박물관) is a museum dedicated to the Sinchon Massacre, a massacre of North Korean civilians carried out by South Korean and US troops during the Korean War. The museum is located in Sinchon County of North Korea. In July 2015, the museum was rebuilt and moved to a new location in the country.

History

The Sinchon Museum of American War Atrocities houses exhibits the deaths of over 35,000 people from 17 October to 7 December in 1950, at the same period of time when the major cities of North Korea, such as Pyongyang (the capital city) and Hamhung, were under wartime occupation by South Korean, American and United Nations military forces.

The Institute for Korean Historical Studies concluded that both Communists and anti-Communist vigilantes engaged in wholesale slaughter throughout the area, and that the 19th Infantry Regiment took the city and failed to prevent the secret police that came with them from perpetuating the civilian murders; however, the regiment did not participate themselves. Furthermore, when Communists retook the city, the population was again purged. Other sources have concluded that the "massacre" was caused by a local rivalry that used the fog of war as a pretense.

Notable visitors

Kim Il-sung visited the museum in 1953 and 1958, as did his son, Kim Jong-il, who paid a visit there in 1962 and 1998.

North Korean leader Kim Jong-un (the son of Kim Jong-il and the grandson of Kim Il-sung) visited the museum along with his sister in 2014.

See also
 List of museums in North Korea

References

External links

 Sinchon Calls for Revenge at Naenara
 Sinchon Museum picture album at Naenara
 Another picture album at Naenara
 Photo gallery of museum artifacts on Flickr
 Traveller's blog about North Korea, with webpage dedicated to Sinchon

Museums in North Korea
Military and war museums
Museums established in 1958
Buildings and structures in South Hwanghae Province
North Korea–United States relations
Genocide museums
Korean War museums
Anti-Americanism